Marika Teini (born 31 January 1989) is a Finnish orienteering competitor. At the 2016 World Orienteering Championships in Strömstad she placed 6th in the middle distance, and won a bronze medal with the Finnish relay team. She repeated her relay bronze medal in 2017, before winning the gold medal at the 2018 European Orienteering Championships in Switzerland, ahead of Swedish runner Tove Alexandersson.

References

External links

1989 births
Living people
Finnish orienteers
Female orienteers
Foot orienteers
World Orienteering Championships medalists
Competitors at the 2017 World Games